Love Frequency is the third and final studio album by English band Klaxons. It was released on 16 June 2014 under Red Records.

Track list

Charts

References

2014 albums
Klaxons albums